Rotana Media Group, commonly known as Rotana, is a Saudi Arabian entertainment company. It is primarily owned by Saudi prince Al Waleed bin Talal.

The media conglomerate includes a film production company (Rotana Studios), free to air television stations (Rotana TV), music channels (Rotana Radio), a record label (Rotana Music Group) and others businesses.

Rotana was founded by Ibrahim Nagro and his brothers, with a 50% share to the Saudi business man Saleeh Kameel.

In 2003, Al Waleed increased his stake to 100 percent, after initially acquiring a 48 percent stake in 2002. He developed Rotana Music Channel as a 24-hour free-to-air service for Rotana artists.  This was followed by Rotana 2, Rotana Clip, augmented with SMS, and Rotana 3 for classical Arab music, followed by a movie channel.

Rotana Records

Rotana Records is a record label with over 100 signed artists.

Rotana Radio
Rotana is a series of radio stations belonging to Rotana Group. Rotana Radio broadcasts in a number of Arab countries and plays almost exclusively music released by Rotana Records.

Stations currently broadcasting:
Lebanon: Radio Rotana Delta 
Jordan: Radio Rotana Jordan
Saudi Arabia: Radio Rotana FM Saudi Arabia
Syria: Radio Style FM

Rotana channels 

Rotana Khalijiah (general entertainment)
Rotana Drama (drama channel) Formerly known as Rotana Masriya from 2011 until 2017
LBC Sat (general women entertainment) - previously known as Al Fadaiyyah al Lubnaniyyah
Rotana Cinema KSA & Rotana Cinema Egypt (Movies channel) - A movie channel established in 2005 that broadcasts exclusively films in Arabic
Rotana Classic (classic movies) - A free to air satellite television specialty channel
Rotana Aflam (films channel) - A free to air satellite television channel was launched in 2012. 
Rotana Clip (music clips channel)
Rotana Mousica (music channel)
Al-Resala (Islamic religious channel)
Rotana Kids (children channel) - Launched in 2020.
Rotana Comedy (comedy channel)

References

External links
Official Bella Rotana Group website

 
Arab mass media
Arabic-language radio stations
Arabic-language television stations
Radio stations established in 1987
Television channels and stations established in 1987